An Englishman in New York is a 2009 biographical film that chronicles the years gay English writer Quentin Crisp spent in New York City, starring John Hurt reprising his role as Crisp from The Naked Civil Servant (1975).  The film takes its title from "Englishman in New York", a song about Crisp written by Sting for the 1987 album ...Nothing Like the Sun.

Plot
The film follows Quentin Crisp's move in the late 1970s from London to New York City, where he was embraced by celebrities and artists. Crisp becomes a local, and then more national celebrity and writes for New York magazines. He struggles to find his way through flippant comments he makes during the AIDS crisis which he refuses to recant. He befriends and helps to promote artist Patrick Angus. In the 1990s, he continues his hefty schedule of public performances, including a two-person show with performance artist Penny Arcade. He appears in the Sally Potter film Orlando as Queen Elizabeth I and appears for the last time in America in a Tampa, Florida gay bar doing a Q&A where he reminds the young crowd of outsiders to "Neither look forward where there is doubt, nor backward where there is regret, look inward and ask, not if there is anything outside that you want, but whether is anything inside that you have not yet unpacked"

Cast

 John Hurt as Quentin Crisp
 Denis O'Hare as Phillip Steele (an amalgam character based on Crisp's friends Phillip Ward and Tom Steele)
 Jonathan Tucker as Patrick Angus, an American artist and Crisp's friend
 Swoosie Kurtz as Connie Clausen, Crisp's agent
 Cynthia Nixon as Penny Arcade, a performance artist and playwright who takes an interest in Crisp

Reception

Critical reception
On review aggregator website Rotten Tomatoes, the film holds an approval rating of 70%, based on 10 reviews, and an average rating of 6.53/10.

Awards
In 2010, An Englishman in New York was nominated for a GLAAD Media Award for Outstanding TV Movie or Mini-Series during the 21st GLAAD Media Awards.

References

External links
 
 Crisperanto: The Quentin Crisp Archives

2009 films
2009 biographical drama films
2009 LGBT-related films
British biographical drama films
British LGBT-related films
LGBT-related drama films
British films set in New York City
Films directed by Richard Laxton
Quentin Crisp
2009 drama films
Biographical films about actors
2000s English-language films
2000s British films
English-language drama films